The 1991 Geneva European Open was a women's tennis tournament played on outdoor clay courts in Geneva, Switzerland that was part of the Tier IV category of the 1991 WTA Tour. It was the 15th edition of the tournament and was held from 20 May until 26 May 1991. Second-seeded Manuela Maleeva-Fragniere won the singles title and earned $27,000 first-prize money.

Finals

Singles

 Manuela Maleeva-Fragniere defeated  Helen Kelesi 6–3, 3–6, 6–3
 It was Maleeva-Fragniere'a 2nd singles title of the year and the 14th of her career.

Doubles
 Nicole Provis /  Elizabeth Smylie defeated  Cathy Caverzasio /  Manuela Maleeva-Fragniere 6–1, 6–2

References

External links
 ITF tournament edition details
 Tournament draws

European Open
WTA Swiss Open
1991 in Swiss tennis
1991 in Swiss women's sport